Andrés Reisinger is an Argentinian digital artist based in Barcelona, Spain. He is the founder of Reisinger Studio, a multidisciplinary design studio located in Barcelona. Reisinger is widely known for industrial design, craft, interior design and conceptual art.

Early life
Reisinger was born in Buenos Aires, in 1990. Initially, he studied music at Conservatorio Nacional Superior de Música. Later he attended the Faculty of Architecture, Design and Urbanism, University of Buenos Aires where he studied graphic design.

Career
Reisinger began his professional career in 2011 as an art director at Plenty, an animation and motion graphic company based in Buenos Aires. In 2014, he co-founded Six N. Five, a multidisciplinary design studio situated in Buenos Aires. Reisinger worked at Six N. Five for 4 years before founding Reisinger Studio in Barcelona, Spain, in 2018.

Hortensia

In 2018, Reisinger designed Hortensia, a virtual armchair covered in pink petals inspired by hydrangea flower. Reisinger posted the digitally rendered version of Hortensia on Instagram in July 2018, after which the design went viral globally and received coverage from major news outlets including Dezeen and Designboom. A physical version of Hortensia was later produced and exhibited at Montoya Gallery in 2018. In 2021, Moooi, a Dutch furniture company collaborated with Reisinger to mass produce the physical version of his Hortensia chair.

The Shipping

In February 2021, Reisinger designed 10 virtual furniture designs and offered them at an online auction titled The Shipping via the online marketplace Nifty Gateway. All of the 10 designs were sold within minutes for more than $450,000.

Arcadia

In October 2021, Reisinger collaborated with RAC, a Portuguese-American musician and poet Arch Hades and created Arcadia, an NFT-based short film. Arcadia is an interdisciplinary project which was sold for nearly half a million dollars at an auction at Christie's in November 2021.

Other works
Since 2018, Reisinger's designs have been exhibited all around the globe at various art galleries. He has also collaborated commercially with some of the prominent international companies including Audi, Microsoft 365, Kettal, Tylko, Cassina, Ikea as well as with Ximena Caminos. In 2019, he was recognized as one of the Young Guns Art Directors Club by The One Club. Later that year, he was also listed in Architectural Digest 100, a list by Architectural Digest that recognizes the most influential interior designers and architects around the world. In 2020, Reisinger was selected as Forbes 30 under 30 by Forbes.

Exhibitions
2018 - 1000 Vases - Espace Commines, Paris, France
2019 - QTS - Buenos Aires, Argentina
2019 - Complicated Sofa - Fuorisalone, Milan, Italy
2019 - Job Interview - Last Resort Gallery, Copenhagen, Denmark
2019 - Maze - 1stdibs Gallery, New York, US
2019 - Hortensia Chair - Montoya Gallery, Barcelona, Spain
2020 - Job Interview - Last Resort Gallery, Copenhagen, Denmark
2020 - Hortensia Chair - Collectible Fair, Brussels, Belgium
2020 - Hortensia Chair - Design Museum Gent, Ghent, Belgium
2021 - The Shipping - Nifty Gateway, US
2021 - Odyssey - Nilufar Gallery, Milan, Italy
2021 - Arcadia - Christie's, New York, US
2021 - The Smell of Pink - Miami, Florida
2022 - Winter House - Metaverse
2022 - Pollination - Nifty Gateway, US
2022 - SUN:LEAF - Collectional Gallery, Dubai, United Arab Emirates
2022 - ARCADIA - Palazzo Strozzi, Firenze, Italy
2022 - TOO MUCH, TOO SOON! - Nilufar Gallery, Milan, Italy

Recognition
2019 - Young Gun (Art Directors New York City) - The One Club
2019 - Architectural Digest 100 -  Architectural Digest
2020 - Forbes 30 under 30  - Forbes

References

External links

Digital artists
Artists from Buenos Aires
Artists from Barcelona
1990 births
Living people